St Cuthbert Without, or simply St Cuthbert, is a civil parish within the City of Carlisle in Cumbria, England.

The parish lies immediately to the south of Carlisle itself and comprises the following settlements - Blackwell, Durdar, Carleton, Brisco and Wreay (the first three are usually regarded as outlying parts of Carlisle, although were not part of the former county borough of Carlisle). According to the 2001 census it had a population of 2,043.

The civil parish was formed in 1866 and has seen various boundary changes during its existence, mostly due to the expansion of Carlisle, although the former separate parish of Wreay was absorbed in 1934.

The parish is named after St Cuthbert's Church in Carlisle city centre. The "Without" part of the name means this was the part of the ecclesiastical parish of St Cuthbert's that was outside the city boundary or walls. The original civil parish of Carlisle St Cuthbert was split in 1866 to form St Cuthbert Without and St Cuthbert Within - the latter of which became part of a merged Carlisle civil parish in 1904.

St Mary's Church (Wreay), built in 1842, is notable for its architecture.

At one time the parish included the modern Carlisle suburbs and districts of Botchergate, St Nicholas, Currock, Upperby and Harraby.

The M6, A6 and West Coast main railway line all run through the parish.  The A6 meets the M6 at junction 42 (the Golden Fleece Roundabout) in Carleton. At different times there have been railway stations at Wreay and Brisco.

The main river in the parish is the River Petteril.

Blackwell
Blackwell is a village in the parish, just south Carlisle. Carlisle Racecourse is in the village.

Durdar
Durdar (postcode district CA2) is a small suburban area based around a crossroads (with a pub the Black Lion, and a petrol station/garage) in the parish, 2 km to the south of the city of Carlisle.

References

External links
 Cumbria County History Trust: Carlisle : St. Cuthbert Without (nb: provisional research only – see Talk page)
Durdar at Streetmap.co.uk

See also

Listed buildings in St Cuthbert Without

Civil parishes in Cumbria
City of Carlisle